Scarus altipinnis, the filament-finned parrotfish, high-fin parrotfish or mini-fin parrotfish, is a species of marine ray-finned fish, a parrotfish from the family Scaridae. It occurs in the tropical and subtropical Western Pacific Ocean.

Description
Scarus altipinnis is distinguished from its congeners in the genus Scarus by the possession of a slightly elongated middle ray in the dorsal fin of the terminal phase males. These males are patterned with green towards the tail and have tow bluish-green bars on their chins and similar coloured spots and lines around the eye and operculum. They also have crescent-shaped tails which have slightly lengthened filaments in their centre. The females, the initial phase, are brownish with a scattering of white spots while the juveniles are striped or mottled with an obvious yellow head.

Distribution
Scarus altipinnis is found in the western Pacific Ocean from the Ryukyu Islands south to Lord Howe Island, throughout Micronesia to the Line Islands and Ducie Island.

Habitat and biology
Scarus altipinnis frequently occurs large groups. The adults are normally recorded along the reef margin of seaward reefs whereas the juveniles and subadults inhabit shallow protected reefs. The adults and subadults are sociable while the juveniles are usually solitary. This is an oviparous fish and the male and female form pairs to spawn.

Human usage
Scarus altipinnis is commercially exploited and may be exported in Micronesia. It is fished for elsewhere in its range on a smaller scale.

Threats
The biggest threat to Scarus altipinnis is commercial fishing, especially in Micronesia, and habitat destruction.

Naming
Scarus altipinnis was first formally described as Pseudoscarus altipinnis in 1879 by the Austrian ichthyologist Franz Steindachner (1834–1919) with the type locality given as the Gilbert Islands.

References

altipinnis
Taxa named by Franz Steindachner
Fish described in 1879